Poggio is an Italian word meaning "knoll". It may refer to:

Places

France
Poggio-di-Nazza, Haute-Corse, Corsica
Poggio-di-Venaco, Haute-Corse, Corsica
Poggio-d'Oletta, Haute-Corse, Corsica
Poggio-Marinaccio, Haute-Corse, Corsica
Poggio-Mezzana, Haute-Corse, Corsica
Santa-Maria-Poggio, Haute-Corse, Corsica

Italy

Municipalities (comuni)
Poggio a Caiano, Prato, Tuscany
Poggio Berni, Rimini, Emilia-Romagna
Poggio Bustone, Rieti, Lazio
Poggio Catino, Rieti, Lazio
Poggio Imperiale, Foggia, Apulia
Poggio Mirteto, Rieti, Lazio
Poggio Moiano, Rieti, Lazio
Poggio Nativo, Rieti, Lazio
Poggio Picenze, L'Aquila, Abruzzo
Poggio Renatico, Ferrara, Emilia-Romagna
Poggio Rusco, Mantova, Lombardy
Poggio San Lorenzo, Rieti, Lazio
Poggio San Marcello, Ancona, Marche
Poggio San Vicino, Macerata, Marche
Poggio Sannita, Isernia, Molise
Poggiodomo, Perugia, Umbria
Poggiofiorito, Chieti, Abruzzo
Poggiomarino, Naples, Campania
Poggioreale, Trapani, Sicily
Poggiorsini, Bari, Apulia
Poggiridenti, Sondrio, Lombardy

Civil parishes (frazioni), quarters, localities
Poggio, Castello di Annone, Asti, Piedmont
Poggio, Marciana, Livorno, Tuscany
Poggio di Ancona, Ancona, Marche
Poggio Buco, site of the ancient Etruscan city Statonia
Poggio dei Pini, a frazione of Capoterra, Cagliari, Sardinia
Poggio di San Remo, a frazione of San Remo, Imperia, Liguria
Poggio Filippo, a frazione of Tagliacozzo, L'Aquila, Abruzzo
Poggio Primocaso, a frazione of Cascia, Perugia, Umbria
Poggio Rattieri, a frazione of Torricella Sicura, Teramo, Abruzzo
Poggio Santa Maria, a frazione of L'Aquila, L'Aquila, Abruzzo 
Poggio Umbricchio, a frazione of Crognaleto, Teramo, Abruzzo
Poggioreale (Naples), a quarter of Naples, Campania

Lakes and mountains
Poggio Civitate, a hill in the commune of Murlo, Tuscany
Poggio Sommorto, a mountain of the Marche
Lago di Poggio Perotto a lake in the province of Grosseto, Tuscany

San Marino
Poggio Casalino, a civil parish (curazia) of Chiesanuova
Poggio Chiesanuova, a civil parish (curazia) of Chiesanuova

Buildings and structures
Poggio Reale (villa), a villa near Naples
Cemetery of Poggioreale, the main cemetery of Naples
Villa del Poggio Imperiale, a former grand ducal villa in Florence

People
Carla Del Poggio (born 1925), Italian cinema, theatre and television actress 
Febo di Poggio, Italian model associated with Michelangelo
Gian Francesco Poggio Bracciolini, Renaissance humanist
Tomaso Poggio, Italian-born neuroscientist at the Massachusetts Institute of Technology

Other
Poggio II, a horse; see Equestrian at the 2004 Summer Olympics – Team eventing

See also
Poggi

Surnames of Italian origin